Saint Andrew South Eastern is a parliamentary constituency represented in the House of Representatives of the Jamaican Parliament, It elects one Member of Parliament MP by the first past the post system of election. The constituency was created in 1967.

Boundaries 

The constituency covers Vineyard Town and Trafalgar in St. Andrew Parish.

Members of Parliament

Elections

References

Parliamentary constituencies of Jamaica